The Duchess of Doubt is a 1917 American silent comedy film, directed by George D. Baker. It stars Emmy Wehlen, Ricca Allen, and Frank Currier, and was released on May 28, 1917.

Cast

References

External links 
 
 
 

American silent feature films
American black-and-white films
Metro Pictures films
Films directed by George D. Baker
1917 comedy films
1917 films
Silent American comedy films
Films produced by B. A. Rolfe
1910s English-language films
1910s American films